Ofeq-11, also known as Ofek 11 (Horizon in Hebrew), is part of the Ofeq family of reconnaissance satellites designed and built by Israel Aerospace Industries (IAI) for the Israeli Ministry of Defense.

Launch 
Ofek-11 was launched on 13 September 2016, at 14:38 UTC from the Palmachim Airbase in Israel, two years after the launch of Ofeq-10. It was delivered using IAI's Shavit 2 launcher. Compared to its predecessor, the new satellite features an improved version of El-Op's "Jupiter High-Resolution Imaging System", with resolution increased to 0.5 meter, and uses a new satellite bus - OPSAT-3000 - which is a derivative of the satellite bus used in TecSAR-1.

Mission 
According to reports, the launch initially looked like a success, but about 90 minutes later, engineers realized that while the satellite had entered orbit, not all systems were functioning or responding to instructions. However, after several days of remote repairs, the satellite was operational and taking high-quality pictures. It has been reported that South Korea is considering utilizing the satellite to obtain reconnaissance on North Korean activities.

References 

Reconnaissance satellites of Israel
2016 in Israel
IAI satellites
Spacecraft launched in 2016
Spacecraft launched by Shavit rockets